

Famous railroaders 
 Casey Jones – Illinois Central engineer whose death in a 1900 train wreck was made famous in song and legend
 Jeme Tien Yow – distinguished Chinese railroad engineer often called the Father of China's railroad.
 Albert Lacombe – made a railroad through Blackfoot territory.

Railroad Tycoons & Businessmen 
 Erastus Corning – Formed the nucleus of what would become the great New York Central Railroad
 Charles Crocker – One of the Big Four co-founders of the Central Pacific Railroad
 Eugene V. Debs – Labor organizer, founding member of Brotherhood of Locomotive Firemen, and participant in the infamous Pullman Strike
 Daniel Drew – Robber baron involved in the stock manipulation of the Erie Railroad with Fisk and Gould
 James Fisk  – Robber baron involved in the stock manipulation of the Erie Railroad with Gould and Drew
 Jay Gould – Robber baron involved in the stock manipulation of the Erie Railroad with Fisk and Drew
 Edward H. Harriman – President of the Union Pacific and the Southern Pacific, and directed the unification of both railroads
 James J. Hill – Founder of the Great Northern Railway, builder of first transcontinental railroad without federal subsidies or land grants
 Cyrus K. Holliday – Founder of the Atchison, Topeka and Santa Fe Railway
 Mark Hopkins – One of the Big Four co-founders of the Central Pacific Railroad
 Collis P. Huntington – One of the Big Four co-founders of the Central Pacific Railroad, founder of Huntington, West Virginia while helping construct the Chesapeake and Ohio Railway
 George Pullman – Inventor of the Pullman sleeper (a luxury sleeping car) and founder of the Pullman Company
  Leland Stanford – One of the Big Four co-founders of the Central Pacific Railroad, president of the Southern Pacific Railroad, governor of California, and founder of Stanford University
  Arthur Stilwell – Founder of the Kansas City Southern Railway, as well as several cities, among them Port Arthur, TX which is named after Stilwell.
 Cornelius Vanderbilt – After spending the first 70 years of his life building a successful ferry business, controlled and expanded the New York Central Railroad into an empire and ordered construction of the first Grand Central Terminal.

See also 
 List of railroad executives

Inventors and innovators 

 Grenville M. Dodge – Chief engineer of the Union Pacific Railroad and helped construct the first American transcontinental railroad.
 Fred Harvey – revolutionized passenger train onboard services, making travel by train more comfortable.
 Theodore Judah – Chief engineer of the Central Pacific Railroad and passionate supporter of the first American transcontinental railroad
 Otto Kuhler – industrial designer
 Raymond Loewy – industrial designer
 Anatole Mallet – inventor of the articulated locomotive, commonly called the Mallet locomotive
 Charles Minot – General Superintendent of the Erie Railroad, first to use the telegraph to dispatch trains in 1851
 Wilhelm von Pressel – designer of the Baghdad Railway
 George Stephenson – "Father of British Steam Railways", inventor of the Rocket steam locomotive (the first "modern" locomotive), and pioneer of the 4 ft 8 ½ inch rail gauge
 Richard Trevithick – credited with the 1804 invention of the steam locomotive
 George Westinghouse – inventor of the air brake
 Girard Scott Ferguson – Union Pacific Signal Design Manager, Inventor of the micron electronic timer

Others
Jesse James – American outlaw, portraying a Robin Hood of sorts, standing up against railroad corporations in defense of the small farmers.
Richard Beeching – household name as chairman of British Rail (1961-1964) famous for Beeching cuts.
 
Rail transport
People